A Christmas tree is a festive decoration. 

It may also refer to:

Biology
 Metrosideros excelsa, the pohutukawa, a New Zealand plant also known as the Christmas tree
 Nuytsia floribunda, a West Australian plant of the genus Nuytsia, also known as the Christmas tree
 Spirobranchus giganteus, a small, tube-building polychaete worm commonly known as the "Christmas tree worm"

Films
 The Christmas Tree (1966 film), British children's film
 The Christmas Tree (1969 film), French drama film (L'Arbre de Noël) 
 The Christmas Tree (1996 film), American drama TV film
 Christmas Trees (2010 film), Russian comedy film

Literature
 Christmas tree emoji (🎄), found in Unicode Miscellaneous Symbols and Pictographs.
 Christmas tree bill, a political term referring to a bill in the U.S. Congress that attracts many, often unrelated, floor amendments
 The Christmas Tree (novel), a 1981 novel by Irish author Jennifer Johnston
 Christmas Tree (short stories), a 1933 collection of short stories by British author Eleanor Smith

Music

 "Christmas Tree" (V song), a 2021 single by V from Our Beloved Summer
 "Christmas Tree" (Lady Gaga song), a 2008 single by Lady Gaga and Space Cowboy
 "Christmas Trees", a 2016 song by Major Lazer
 “O Christmas Tree”, the English version of the song “O Tannenbaum”

Places
 Christmas tree (aviation), a term for alert aprons of the United States Air Force during the Cold War
 Christmas Tree Lane, a boulevard in Altadena, California, USA
 The Christmas Tree Cluster, a distinctive star cluster of the astronomical object NGC 2264 in Monoceros constellation

Equipment
 Christmas tree (oil well), an assembly of valves used in oil and gas extraction
 Christmas tree (drag racing), the series of lights used to start drag races.

Finance
 Ladder (option combination), a combination of three options also known as a Christmas tree
 A combination of six options similar to a butterfly

Other
 "Christmas Tree" formation, a pattern of positions in association football 
 Christmas tree packet, a unit of data used in information technology

See also

 
 
 
 Tannenbaum (disambiguation)
 Christmas (disambiguation)
 Xmas (disambiguation)
 Tree (disambiguation)